Walthère Victor Spring (6 March 1848 – 17 July 1911) was a Belgian experimental chemist and a professor at the University of Liège who contributed to ideas on carbon dioxide in the atmosphere and the Greenhouse Effect. As a physical chemist he demonstrated the formation of certain compounds such as metal sulphides under high pressure conditions. He also took an interest in the study of the Tyndall effect and examined the cause of the colour of the sky and water.

Spring was born in Liège to physician and professor of medicine, Antoine Spring (1814–1872) who was of Bavarian ancestry. He experimented in physics and chemistry but studied classical languages and humanities at the Athenaeum. He failed the examination to enter university but took an interest in practical work. He worked for a while with an arms manufacturer in Liège but was encouraged by the chemist Jean-Servais Stas (1813–1891) to study and he joined the Mining School from where he received a diploma in 1871. He then went to Bonn to study under Friedrich August Kékulé (1829–1896) and Rudolf  Clausius (1822–1888). He joined the University of Liège in 1876 as a lecturer in mathematical physics but taught organic chemistry soon after. He was a corresponding member of the Belgian Royal Academy of Sciences from 1877 and became its president in 1899. 

In 1886 he gave a presentation at the Academy on variability of carbon dioxide content in the atmosphere and noted that the city of Liège had a higher concentration than the surrounding countryside, possibly due to the use of coal for heating homes and the slow burning of grisou in the Saint-Jacques district which produced methane. Along with Leon Roland he examined weather measurements and noted that the air cooled less slowly due to the water vapour and carbon dioxide. Cape Walthère Spring in the Antarctic was named after him by the de Gerlache expedition.

References 

1848 births
1911 deaths
Belgian chemists
University of Liège alumni